Hydroprene is an insect growth regulator used as an insecticide.  It is used against cockroaches, beetles, and moths. Products using hydroprene include Gencor, Gentrol, and Raid Max Sterilizer Discs.  Hydropene is a synthetic juvenile hormone mimic, disrupting insect larval development like molting.

References

External links
 

Insecticides
Ethyl esters
Dienes
Carboxylate esters